Route 368 is a 72 km two-lane east/west highway in Quebec, Canada, which is located on Île d'Orléans and includes the Pont de l'Île which connects the island to the mainland. It starts at the junction of Autoroute 40 at exit 325 in Beauport, now part of Quebec City, crosses the bridge and it follows around the island's perimeter, passing through all 6 villages on the island.

On Orleans Island, the route is also known as Chemin Royal (Royal Road) which was completed in 1744.

Towns located along Route 368

 Beauport, Quebec City
 Saint-Pierre-de-l'Île-d'Orléans
 Sainte-Famille-de-l'Île-d'Orléans
 Saint-Francois
 Saint-Jean
 Saint-Laurent-de-l'Ile-d'Orleans
 Sainte-Pétronille

See also
 List of Quebec provincial highways

References

External links  
 Provincial Route Map (Courtesy of the Quebec Ministry of Transportation) 
Route 368 on Google Maps

368
Streets in Quebec City